Vey Nesar (also Romanized as Vey Nesār, Vīnesār, and Vīnsar; also known as Wanesār) is a village in Chaharduli-ye Sharqi Rural District, Chaharduli District, Qorveh County, Kurdistan Province, Iran. At the 2006 census, its population was 2,249, in 547 families.

Language 
Linguistic composition of the city:

References 

Towns and villages in Qorveh County
Kurdish settlements in Kurdistan Province